Untir-untir or kue tambang is a traditional Indonesian deep-fried twisted doughnut—that fried in peanut oil. This dish has a shiny and golden look with crispy taste, almost similar to mahua in Chinese cuisine and lubid-lubid in Filipino cuisine. In Javanese untir-untir means "twisted", while in Indonesian kue tambang means "rope cake"; both refer to its twisted rope-like shape. This doughnut popular in Javanese community in Java, but today it can found nationwide. Sesame seeds can be added in the untir-untir.

See also

Cakwe
 Shakoy
Chinese Indonesian cuisine
Javanese cuisine
Kue
List of Indonesian dishes
List of Indonesian snacks

References

Doughnuts
Indonesian desserts